Centurion Air Cargo, operating as Centurion Cargo, was an American cargo airline based in Miami, Florida, United States.

History

The airline was established as Challenge Air Cargo in 1985 as a subsidiary of Challenge Air Transport. In 1986, the airline became independent of Challenge Air Transport. In 2001, following the takeover of the scheduled business by United Parcel Service a new company was formed as Centurion Air Cargo to take over the air operating certificate of Challenge.

The airline surrendered its operating certificate to the Federal Aviation Administration in June 2018, after being unable to restructure its operations after financial difficulties.

Centurion Cargo Center
The Centurion Cargo Center was a cargo terminal located at Miami International Airport, opened in 2013.

The facility comprised a 1,400,000 square feet (130,000 m2) area incorporating a 550,000 square feet (51,000 m2) warehouse with both cold and dry storage facilities.

Centurion Cargo Center was the largest privately owned, all cargo airline facility in North America before its operation was shut down.

Destinations
Centurion Air Cargo operated to be the following destinations:

Fleet

The airline fleet previously included the following aircraft:

Accidents and incidents
On July 7, 2008, Centurion Air Cargo Flight 164 crashed near El Dorado International Airport in Bogota, Colombia, killing three people in a nearby house.
On October 20, 2009, Centurion Air Cargo Flight 431, a McDonnell Douglas MD-11F (registered N701GC) sustained damage on landing at Carrasco International Airport. The right hand main landing gear leg was bent sideways during landing on runway 24. The crew managed to stop on taxiway A where the airplane had to be offloaded.
On October 13, 2012, Centurion Air Cargo Flight 425, a McDonnell Douglas MD-11F (registered N988AR) sustained substantial damage while landing at Viracopos International Airport. Upon touchdown, the left landing gear collapsed and the aircraft skidded along the runway for 800 meters before stopping. The aircraft was written off afterwards. All 3 occupants on board were uninjured.

See also
Cielos Airlines
List of defunct airlines of the United States
Sky Lease Cargo

References

Jones, Geoffry P. "Miami Challenge". Air International, November 1993, Vol 45 No 5. ISSN 0306-5634. pp. 241–244.

External links

Centurion Air Cargo

Defunct airlines of the United States
Airlines established in 1985
Airlines disestablished in 2018
Cargo airlines of the United States
Airlines based in Florida
Companies based in Miami-Dade County, Florida
1985 establishments in Florida
2018 disestablishments in Florida
Defunct companies based in Florida